Area code 808 is a telephone area code in the North American Numbering Plan (NANP) for the Hawaiian Islands, comprising the windward and the leeward islands. The area code also serves Wake Island in the western Pacific Ocean. The code was assigned on August 8, 1957, about two years before the statehood of Hawaii.

Slightly over 1.4 million people live in Hawaii. Despite the state's rapid growth, and the proliferation of mobile numbers (particularly in Oahu, which includes Honolulu), a single area code is projected to be enough to serve the state until at least the third quarter of 2035.

Prior to October 2021, area code 808 had telephone numbers assigned for the central office code 988. In 2020, 988 was designated nationwide as a dialing code for the National Suicide Prevention Lifeline, which created a conflict for exchanges that permit seven-digit dialing. This area code transitioned to ten-digit dialing on October 24, 2021.

Marcus Mariota, quarterback for the Las Vegas Raiders football team and 2014 Heisman Trophy winner, had a special face mask honoring the 808 area code while playing with the University of Oregon.

See also
 Ate-Oh-Ate, restaurant in Portland, Oregon, named after the area code
 List of NANP area codes

References

External links 

 808 Area Code
 area code 808

808
808
Telecommunications-related introductions in 1959
Communications in Hawaii